The Statue of Carlo Barberini was a large statue of the brother of Pope Urban VIII,  Carlo Barberini, erected in the Palazzo dei Conservatori, Rome, following his death in 1630. The statue made use of an existing antique statue of Julius Caesar. The Roman authorities then commissioned the two most renowned sculptures of the day, Gianlorenzo Bernini and Alessandro Algardi, to add to the torso; Bernini worked on the head and Algardi on the limbs.

See also
List of works by Gian Lorenzo Bernini

Notes

References

Further reading

External links
 

1630s sculptures
Marble sculptures in Italy
Sculptures by Gian Lorenzo Bernini